Balance may refer to:

Common meanings
 Balance (ability) in biomechanics
 Balance (accounting)
 Balance or weighing scale
 Balance, as in equality (mathematics) or equilibrium

Arts and entertainment

Film
 Balance (1983 film), a Bulgarian film
 Balance (1989 film), a short animated film
 La Balance, a 1982 French film

Television
 Balance: Television for Living Well, a Canadian television talk show
 "The Balance" (Roswell), an episode of the television series Roswell
 "The Balance", an episode of the animated series Justice League

Music

Performers
 Balance (band), a 1980s pop-rock group

Albums
 Balance (Akrobatik album), 2003
 Balance (Kim-Lian album), 2004
 Balance (Leo Kottke album), 1978
 Balance (Joe Morris album), 2014
 Balance (Swollen Members album), 1999
 Balance (Ty Tabor album), 2008
 Balance (Van Halen album), 1995
 Balance (Armin van Buuren album), 2019
 The Balance, a 2019 album by Catfish and the Bottlemen

Songs
 "Balance", a song by Axium from The Story Thus Far
 "Balance", a song by Band-Maid from Unleash
 "The Balance", a Moody Blues song on the 1970 album A Question of Balance

Other
 Balance (game design), the concept and the practice of tuning relationships between a game's component systems
 Balance (installation), a 2013 glazed ceramic installation by Tim Ryan
 Balance (puzzle), a mathematical puzzle
 "Balance", a poem by Patti Smith from the book kodak

Government and law
 BALANCE Act (Benefit Authors without Limiting Advancement or Net Consumer Expectations Act), a proposed US federal legislation
 Balance (apportionment), a criterion for fair allocation of seats among parties or states

Other uses 
 Balance (advertisement), a 1989 award-winning television advertisement for the Lexus LS 400
 Balance (metaphysics), a desirable point between two or more opposite forces
 Balance (stereo), the amount of signal from each channel reproduced in a stereo audio recording
 The Balance, a personal finance website owned by Dotdash

See also
 Balancing (disambiguation)
 Balanced, a wine tasting descriptor